Peng Chau is a small island located off the north-eastern coast of Lantau Island, Hong Kong. It is known locally for its temples, fishing industry and seafood.

Geography

In 2003, the island underwent land degradation restorative work.

Administration
Politically, Peng Chau is part of Peng Chau & Hei Ling Chau constituency of the Islands District Council.

The executive branch of the government of the island included department of the Islands District Office of the Home Affairs Department.

The local police station belongs to the Cheung Chau Division of the Marine Police.

Features
There are several temples on Peng Chau, including:
 Tin Hau temple, built in 1792
 Golden Flower Shrine, dedicated to Lady Kam Fa
 Lung Mo Temple
 Seven Sisters Temple

The island is also the site of the, now defunct, Peng Chau Theatre.

There are remains of the Sing Lei Hap Gei Lime Kiln Factory, established in the 19th century, and the Great China Match Company Factory, built in 1938.

Transportation

The main mode of transportation on the island is the bicycle, or on foot. Motor vehicles are not permitted on the island except emergency services, construction and village vehicles used for the transport of goods around the island.

Peng Chau is accessible by ferry (Hong Kong & Kowloon Ferry) from Central on Hong Kong Island, or by ferry from Cheung Chau via Mui Wo and Chi Ma Wan (Sun Ferry), or by Kai-to ferry from Discovery Bay on Lantau Island.

Helicopters are sometimes used in medical emergencies.

Peng Chau is linked to Tai Lei Island by a bridge. The bridge is part of Peng Lei Road. It is a popular fishing spot.

Education
Peng Chau is in Primary One Admission (POA) School Net 99, which contains two aided schools: Holy Family School in Peng Chau and SKH Wei Lun Primary School in Discovery Bay; no government primary schools are in this net.

In popular culture
The 2015 Hong Kong film Wong Ka Yan was set in Peng Chau, starring Wong You Nam and Karena Ng.

See also

 List of islands and peninsulas of Hong Kong
Finger Hill
 List of places in Hong Kong

References

Further reading

External links

 Peng Chau page at the Hong Kong Tourism Board.
 Simple Life in Peng Chau - TV program by the Radio Television Hong Kong on Peng Chau (video archive).
 Green Peng Chau Association
 Antiquities Advisory Board. Historic Building Appraisal. School building of 1935, Peng Chau Chi Yan Public School Pictures
 Antiquities Advisory Board. Historic Building Appraisal. I Tze, Shan Tang Tsuen, Peng Chau Pictures
 Antiquities Advisory Board. Historic Building Appraisal. Stone House, Nos. 46-48 Peng Chau Wing On Street Pictures
 Antiquities Advisory Board. Historic Building Appraisal. Leather Factory, Peng Chau Pictures
 Antiquities Advisory Board. Historic Building Appraisal. Tin Hau Temple, Peng Chau Pictures

 
Populated places in Hong Kong
Islands of Hong Kong